The Shire of Richmond is a local government area in north western Queensland, Australia.

It is part of the Gulf Country.

History 
Wanamarra (also known as Maykulan and Wunumura is an Australian Aboriginal language in North West Queensland. The language region includes areas within the Shire of McKinlay, Shire of Cloncurry and Shire of Richmond, including the Flinders River area, and the towns of Kynuna and Richmond.

The Shire of Wyangarie, named for a prominent grazing homestead in the area, was created on 1 January 1916 out of part of the Shire of Flinders under the Local Authorities Act 1902. On 24 July 1930, it lost part of its area to Shire of McKinlay. On 31 July 1954, it was renamed Richmond.

Towns and localities 
The Shire of Richmond includes the following settlements:

 Richmond
 Albion
 Burleigh
 Cambridge
 Maxwelton
 Nonda
 Saxby
 Woolgar

Amenities 
The Richmond Shire Council operate several services in the town including:
 Richmond Public Library
 Richmond Public Gym
 Richmond Childcare Centre
 Richmond After School Care
 Richmond Swimming Pool
 Richmond Caravan Park

Chairmen and Mayors

 1927: Campbell Robert Murray 
 1997–present: John McArthur Wharton AM

Population

References

 
Local government areas of Queensland
North West Queensland
1916 establishments in Australia